The 2005 Gujarat floods, during the monsoon season, affected the state of Gujarat, India, that included 20 districts (out of 33), with 10 of them severely affected. 117 of the 225 Tehsils (Talukas or mandals), 11 cities were included, and more than 7,200 villages inundated, with up to 10,000 affected. The cumulative  of rain left approximately 176,000 people homeless during the flooding that included the drowning of a rare Asiatic lion from the Gir wildlife sanctuary. At least 173 people were killed in the flooding.

History
Eleven cities were severely affected by the floods that were Vadodara, Nadiad, Ahmedabad, Navsari, Surat and Limbdi, Dakor, Anand, Kheda, Petlad, and Borsad.

A brief time-line

See also 
 Disaster Management Act, 2005
 Maharashtra floods of 2005
 2005 Chennai floods
 2006 Surat flood
 2017 Gujarat flood
 2019 Vadodara flood

References

External links
 Rediff.com. 
 The Hindu
  NASA Earth Observatory
 Reuters

History of Gujarat (1947–present)
Floods in Gujarat
Gujarat
Gujarat